1898 in sports describes the year's events in world sport.

American football
College championship
 College football national championship – Harvard Crimson

Professional championships
 Western Pennsylvania champions – Duquesne Country and Athletic Club

Events
 The Morgan Athletic Club, which will eventually become Arizona Cardinals, is founded in Chicago and is the sport's oldest professional team.
 3 December — the Western Pennsylvania All-Stars are defeated by the Duquesne Country and Athletic Club, 16–0, in the very first all-star game for professional football.

Association football
Belgium
 Standard Liège was founded.
England
 The Football League – Sheffield United 42 points, Sunderland 37, Wolves 35, Everton 35, Sheffield Wednesday 33, Aston Villa 33
 FA Cup final – Nottingham Forest 3–1 Derby County at Crystal Palace, London.
 Both the Football League First and Second Divisions are expanded from 16 to 18 teams in 1898, bringing the total number of League sides to 36. Additionally, the test match system is abandoned in favour of automatic relegation and promotion.  There is no relegation from the First Division in 1898, Burnley and Newcastle United being promoted to increase the number of teams to 18.  To increase the size of the Second Division, Burslem Port Vale is restored to the League; Barnsley, Glossop (1898–1915) and New Brighton Tower (1898–1901) are elected for the first time.
Italy
 Formation of the Italian Football Federation (Federazione Italiana Giuoco Calcio or FIGC) in Turin. It is also known as Federcalcio.
Scotland
 Scottish Football League – Celtic
 Scottish Cup – Rangers 2–0 Kilmarnock at Hampden Park

Athletics
USA Outdoor Track and Field Championships
 Ronald J. MacDonald wins the second running of the Boston Marathon.

Australian rules football
VFL Premiership
 Fitzroy wins the 2nd VFL Premiership: Fitzroy 5.8 (38) d Essendon 3.5 (23) at Junction Oval

Baseball
National championship
 National League championship – Boston Beaneaters.  This is Boston's fifth championship in eight years under manager Frank Selee.
Events
 22 April — multiple no-hitters are thrown on the same day by two players: Ted Breitenstein and Jay Hughes.

Basketball
USA
 23 April – The 23rd Street YMCA of New York City wins the first national basketball championship tournament, organized by the U.S. Amateur Athletic Union (AAU).

Boxing
Lineal world champions
 World Heavyweight Championship – Bob Fitzsimmons
 World Middleweight Championship – vacant → Tommy Ryan
 World Welterweight Championship – Tommy Ryan → Ryan vacates title → "Mysterious" Billy Smith
 World Lightweight Championship – George "Kid" Lavigne
 World Featherweight Championship – Solly Smith → Dave Sullivan → George Dixon
 World Bantamweight Championship – Jimmy Barry

Cricket
England
 County Championship – Yorkshire
 Minor Counties Championship – Worcestershire
 Most runs – Bobby Abel 2053 @ 48.88 (HS 219)
 Most wickets – Jack Hearne 222 @ 14.05 (BB 9–68)
 Wisden Five Cricketers of the Year – Wilfred Rhodes, Bill Storer, Charlie Townsend, Albert Trott, William Lockwood
Australia
 Sheffield Shield – Victoria
 Most runs – Clem Hill 1196 @ 66.44 (HS 200)
 Most wickets – Ernie Jones 76 @ 21.75 (BB 7–80)
India
 Bombay Presidency – Parsees
South Africa
 Currie Cup – Griqualand West
West Indies
 Inter-Colonial Tournament – not contested

Figure skating
World Figure Skating Championships
 World Men's Champion – Henning Grenander (Sweden)

Golf
Major tournaments
 British Open – Harry Vardon
 U.S. Open – Fred Herd
Other tournaments
 British Amateur – Freddie Tait
 US Amateur – Findlay S. Douglas

Horse racing
Events
 11 June — Willie Simms becomes the only African-American jockey to win all three races of the United States Triple Crown Races when he rides Sly Fox to victory in the Preakness Stakes.
England
 Grand National – Drogheda
 1,000 Guineas Stakes – Nun Nicer
 2,000 Guineas Stakes – Disraeli
 The Derby – Jeddah
 The Oaks – Airs and Graces
 St. Leger Stakes – Wildfowler
Australia
 Melbourne Cup – The Grafter
Canada
 Queen's Plate – Bon Ino
Ireland
 Irish Grand National – Porridge
 Irish Derby Stakes – Noble Howard
USA
 Kentucky Derby – Plaudit
 Preakness Stakes – Sly Fox
 Belmont Stakes – Bowling Brook

Ice hockey
Stanley Cup
 5 March — Montreal Victorias wins the Amateur Hockey Association of Canada (AHAC) championship and the Stanley Cup. It is the club's fourth AHAC championship in a row and second straight Cup title.
Events
 10 December — first championship ice hockey league, the Amateur Hockey Association of Canada (AHAC) disbands over a dispute to allow a new member in its senior league. The Canadian Amateur Hockey League (CAHL) is formed to replace it, from the clubs seceding from AHAC.

Motor racing
Paris-Amsterdam-Paris Trail
 The 1898 Paris–Amsterdam–Paris Trail is run on 7–13 July over 1431 km and won by Fernand Charron driving a Panhard-Levassor in a time of 33:04:34.  The race is in retrospect sometimes referred to as the III Grand Prix de l'ACF.

Rowing
The Boat Race
 26 March — Oxford wins the 55th Oxford and Cambridge Boat Race

Rugby league
Events
 Dewsbury RLFC founded
England
 Championship – not contested
 Challenge Cup final – Batley 7–0 Bradford F.C. at Headingley Rugby Stadium, Leeds
 Lancashire League Championship – Oldham
 Yorkshire League Championship – Hunslet

Rugby union
Home Nations Championship
 16th Home Nations Championship series is not completed
Events
 London Irish founded

Speed skating
Speed Skating World Championships
 Men's All-round Champion – Peder Østlund (Norway)

Tennis
England
 Wimbledon Men's Singles Championship – Reginald Doherty (GB) defeats Laurence Doherty (GB) 6–3 6–3 2–6 5–7 6–1
 Wimbledon Women's Singles Championship – Charlotte Cooper Sterry (GB) defeats Louisa Martin (GB) 6–4 6–4
France
 French Men's Singles Championship – Paul Aymé (France) defeats Paul Lebreton (France): details unknown
 French Women's Singles Championship – Françoise Masson (France) wins: details unknown
USA
 American Men's Singles Championship – Malcolm Whitman (USA) defeats Dwight F. Davis (USA) 3–6 6–2 6–2 6–1
 American Women's Singles Championship – Juliette Atkinson (USA) defeats Marion Jones (USA) 6–3 5–7 6–4 2–6 7–5

References

 
Sports by year